Manuel Jesús Casas García (born 14 June 1985), known as Molo, is a Spanish former footballer who played as a central defender and a current manager.

He made five appearances in Segunda División for Almería and Lorca, but spent most of his career in Segunda División B, where he played 256 games in service of eight clubs, mostly Lleida Esportiu.

Playing career
Born in Almería, Andalusia, Molo played as a youth for CD Comarca de Níjar before joining UD Almería. He made his professional debut for his hometown club in Segunda División on 22 January 2006 in a 2–1 home win over CD Castellón, coming on for José Ortiz for the last eight minutes, and added three more games over the season.

Molo then moved on to UE Figueres, Villarreal CF B and CA Osasuna B in Segunda División B. In November 2008, while training with the first team of the last of those sides, he suffered an anterior cruciate ligament injury.

After a year with CD Guijuelo, Molo joined Lleida Esportiu in 2012. Four years later, after being denied promotion in the play-offs by Sevilla Atlético, he became the first signing of the renamed Lorca FC; despite his experience in the third level it was his first experience of Group IV, the one containing clubs from his own region. They gained promotion and he made his only professional appearance since the start of his career on 25 November 2017, playing the last two minutes of a 2–0 win at Gimnàstic de Tarragona.

Molo left Lorca in January 2018, returning to the third tier with Real Murcia. After being eliminated from the playoffs by Elche CF, he cancelled the last 12 months of his contract in June and made his way to CD El Ejido in the same division.

Coaching career
In June 2019, shortly after El Ejido's relegation, Molo returned to Lleida to manage them for the upcoming campaign. He was dismissed by president Albert Esteve on 24 May 2021, following a descent to the fourth tier. In July 2022, he joined UCAM Murcia CF, who had recently been relegated to the fourth tier of Spanish football. He replaced José Manuel Aira.

Managerial statistics

References

External links

1985 births
Living people
Footballers from Almería
Spanish footballers
Association football defenders
Segunda División players
Segunda División B players
UD Almería B players
UD Almería players
UE Figueres footballers
Villarreal CF B players
CA Osasuna B players
CD Guijuelo footballers
Lleida Esportiu footballers
Lorca FC players
Real Murcia players
CD El Ejido players
Spanish football managers
Segunda División B managers
Segunda Federación managers
Lleida Esportiu managers
Águilas FC managers
UCAM Murcia CF managers